Broadfield, sometimes called Broadfields, is a rural locality in the Selwyn District of New Zealand. It is located between Rolleston, Prebbleton and Lincoln.

Broadfield NZ Landscape Garden is a private garden covering , which is open to the public two days a week.

Demographics 

Trents had a population of 1,917 at the 2018 New Zealand census, an increase of 63 people (3.4%) since the 2013 census, and an increase of 435 people (29.4%) since the 2006 census. There were 663 households. There were 999 males and 918 females, giving a sex ratio of 1.09 males per female. The median age was 45.8 years (compared with 37.4 years nationally), with 360 people (18.8%) aged under 15 years, 282 (14.7%) aged 15 to 29, 987 (51.5%) aged 30 to 64, and 288 (15.0%) aged 65 or older.

Ethnicities were 91.5% European/Pākehā, 7.7% Māori, 1.1% Pacific peoples, 5.2% Asian, and 2.0% other ethnicities (totals add to more than 100% since people could identify with multiple ethnicities).

The proportion of people born overseas was 14.2%, compared with 27.1% nationally.

Although some people objected to giving their religion, 52.7% had no religion, 39.4% were Christian, 0.2% were Buddhist and 0.9% had other religions.

Of those at least 15 years old, 330 (21.2%) people had a bachelor or higher degree, and 240 (15.4%) people had no formal qualifications. The median income was $44,800, compared with $31,800 nationally. The employment status of those at least 15 was that 855 (54.9%) people were employed full-time, 342 (22.0%) were part-time, and 24 (1.5%) were unemployed.

Education
Broadfield School is a full primary school catering for years 1 to 8.

Notable people
Samuel Dening Glyde, farmer and educator
Gerald Stokell, amateur ichthyologist

External links

References

Selwyn District
Populated places in Canterbury, New Zealand